Peter Hare may refer to:

 Peter Hare (officer) (1748–1834), company officer in Butler's Rangers
 Peter Hewitt Hare (1935–2008), American philosopher
 Peter Hare (cricketer) (1920–2001), English cricketer and educator